{{Album ratings
| rev1      = AllMusic
| rev1Score = <ref name="Album Info">{{Allmusic |class=album |id=go-ju-ju-go-mw0000922595 |tab=overview |label=E.U.: Go Ju Ju Go' |accessdate=12 October 2016}}</ref>
| rev2     = Robert Christgau
| rev2Score = 
|rev3 = The Rolling Stone Album Guide|rev3score = 
}}Go Ju Ju Go'' is a live album by the Washington, D.C.-based go-go band E.U., released in 1987.

Track listing

Side A
"Go Ju Ju Go" – 4:45
"Shake It Like a White Girl" – 2:30
"Alright Oh No" – 2:30

Side B
"Bear's Melody (I Got a Little Song)" – 6:30
"Go Go Trail" – 4:30
"Pump It Up" – 2:00
"Hey Hey Hey" – 2:00

Personnel
 Gregory "Sugar Bear" Elliott – lead vocals, bass guitar
 Ivan Goff – keyboards
 Kent Wood – keyboards
 William "Ju Ju" House – drums
 Genairo "Foxxy" Brown Foxx – congas, percussions
 Timothy "Short Tim" Glover – percussions
 Valentino "Tino" Jackson – electric guitar
 Darryel "Tidy Boy" Hayes – trumpet
 Michal "Go Go Mike" Taylor – trombone

References

External links
 Go Ju Ju Go at Discogs

1987 live albums
Experience Unlimited albums